The concept of an archetype appears in areas relating to behavior, historical psychology, and literary analysis.

An archetype can be any of the following:
 a statement, pattern of behavior, prototype, "first" form, or a main model that other statements, patterns of behavior, and objects copy, emulate, or "merge" into. Informal synonyms frequently used for this definition include "standard example", "basic example", and the longer-form "archetypal example"; mathematical archetypes often appear as "canonical examples".
 the Platonic concept of pure form, believed to embody the fundamental characteristics of a thing.
 a collectively-inherited unconscious idea, a pattern of thought, image, etc., that is universally present, in individual psyches, as in Jungian psychology
 a constantly-recurring symbol or motif in literature, painting, or mythology. This definition refers to the recurrence of characters or ideas sharing similar traits throughout various, seemingly unrelated cases in classic storytelling, media, etc. This usage of the term draws from both comparative anthropology and from Jungian archetypal theory.

Archetypes are also very close analogies to instincts, in that, long before any consciousness develops, it is the impersonal and inherited traits of human beings that present and motivate human behavior. They also continue to influence feelings and behavior even after some degree of consciousness developed later on.

Etymology
The word archetype, "original pattern from which copies are made," first entered into English usage in the 1540s. It, thus, referred to the beginning or origin of the pattern, model or type.

Archetypes in literature

Function
Usage of archetypes in specific pieces of writing is a holistic approach, which can help the writing win universal acceptance. This is because readers can relate to and identify with the characters and the situation, both socially and culturally. By deploying common archetypes contextually, a writer aims to impart realism to their work. According to many literary critics, archetypes have a standard and recurring depiction in a particular human culture or the whole human race that ultimately lays concrete pillars and can shape the whole structure in a literary work.

Story archetypes 
Christopher Booker, author of The Seven Basic Plots: Why We Tell Stories, argues that the following basic archetypes underlie all stories:
 Overcoming the Monster
 Rags to Riches
 The Quest
 Voyage and Return
Comedy
Tragedy
Rebirth

These themes coincide with the characters of Jung's archetypes.

Literary criticism

Archetypal literary criticism argues that archetypes determine the form and function of literary works and that a text's meaning is shaped by cultural and psychological myths. Cultural archetypes are the unknowable basic forms personified or made concrete by recurring images, symbols, or patterns (which may include motifs such as the "quest" or the "heavenly ascent"; recognizable character types such as the "trickster", "saint", "martyr" or the "hero"; symbols such as the apple or the snake; and imagery) and that have all been laden with meaning prior to their inclusion in any particular work.

The archetypes reveal shared roles universal among societies, such as the role of the mother in her natural relations with all members of the family. These archetypes create a shared imagery which is defined by many stereotypes that have not separated themselves from the traditional, biological, religious, and mythical framework.

Platonic archetypes

The origins of the archetypal hypothesis date as far back as Plato. Plato's eidos, or ideas, were pure mental forms that were imprinted in the soul before it was born into the world. Some philosophers also translate the archetype as "essence" in order to avoid confusion with respect to Plato's conceptualization of Forms. While it is tempting to think of Forms as mental entities (ideas) that exist only in our mind, the philosopher insisted that they are independent of any minds (real). Eidos were collective in the sense that they embodied the fundamental characteristics of a thing rather than its specific peculiarities. In the seventeenth century, Sir Thomas Browne and Francis Bacon both employ the word archetype in their writings; Browne in The Garden of Cyrus (1658) attempted to depict archetypes in his usage of symbolic proper-names.

Jungian archetypes

The concept of psychological archetypes was advanced by the Swiss psychiatrist Carl Jung, c. 1919. Jung has acknowledged that his conceptualization of archetype is influenced by Plato's eidos, which he described as "the formulated meaning of a primordial image by which it was represented symbolically." According to Jung, the term archetype is an explanatory paraphrase of the Platonic eidos, also believed to represent the word form. He maintained that Platonic archetypes are metaphysical ideas, paradigms, or models, and that real things are held to be only copies of these model ideas. However, archetypes are not easily recognizable in Plato's works in the way in which Jung meant them.

In Jung's psychological framework, archetypes are innate, libidinally collective schemas, universal prototypes for idea-sensory impression images and may be used to interpret observations. A group of memories and interpretations associated with an archetype is a complex (e.g. a mother complex associated with the mother archetype). Jung treated the archetypes as psychological organs, analogous to physical ones in that both are morphological constructs that arose through evolution. At the same time, it has also been observed that evolution can itself be considered an archetypal construct.
Jung states in part one of Man And His Symbols that:While there are a variety of categorizations of archetypes, Jung's configuration is perhaps the most well known and serves as the foundation for many other models. The four major archetypes to emerge from his work, which Jung originally terms primordial images, include the anima/animus, the self, the shadow, and the persona. Additionally, Jung referred to images of the wise old man, the child, the mother, and the maiden. He believed that each human mind retains these basic unconscious understandings of the human condition and the collective knowledge of our species in the construct of the collective unconscious.

Neo-Jungian concepts 
Other authors, such as Carol Pearson and Margaret Mark, have attributed 12 different archetypes to Jung, organized in three overarching categories, based on a fundamental driving force. These include:

Other authors, such as Margaret Hartwell and Joshua Chen, go further to give these 12 archetypes families 5 archetypes each.
They are as follows:

Other uses of archetypes 
There is also the position that the use of archetypes in different ways is possible because every archetype has multiple manifestations, with each one featuring different attributes. For instance, there is the position that the function of the archetype must be approached according to the context of biological sciences and is accomplished through the concept of the ultimate function. This pertains to the organism's response to those pressures in terms of biological trait.

Dichter's application of archetypes 
Later in the 1900s, a Viennese psychologist named Dr. Ernest Dichter took these psychological constructs and applied them to marketing. Dichter moved to New York around 1939  and sent every ad agency on Madison Avenue a letter boasting of his new discovery. He found that applying these universal themes to products promoted easier discovery and stronger loyalty for brands.

See also

 Allegory of the Cave
 Archetypal pedagogy
 Archive for Research in Archetypal Symbolism
 Character (arts)
 Cliché
 Dmuta in Mandaeism
 Mental model
 Monomyth
 Ostensive definition
 Perennial philosophy
 Personification
 Prototype
 Role reversal
 Simulacrum
 Stereotype
 System archetypes
 Theory of Forms
 Type (biology)
 Wounded healer

References

External links

 
Archetypal pedagogy
Archetypal psychology
Cultural anthropology
Literary concepts
Narratology
Social psychology
Tropes